Rodker is a surname. It may refer to:

Joan Rodker (1915–2010), English political activist and television producer
John Rodker (1894–1955), English writer, modernist poet, and publisher of modernist writers
Mary Rodker, marriage name of Mary Butts (1890–1937), English modernist writer